Mohan Baniya is a Nepali communist politician,who served as Minister of Office of the Prime Minister and Council of Ministers  and member of the House of Representatives of the federal parliament of Nepal. He was elected under the proportional representation system from CPN UML.

References

Living people
Communist Party of Nepal (Unified Marxist–Leninist) politicians
Nepal Communist Party (NCP) politicians
21st-century Nepalese people
Place of birth missing (living people)
Khas people
Nepal MPs 2017–2022
Members of the 2nd Nepalese Constituent Assembly
1964 births